Delbert Bower "Deb" Smith (January 7, 1920 – February 25, 2009) was an American professional basketball player. He played for the St. Louis Bombers in the 1946–47 Basketball Association of America season. It was the first year of the league's existence. The BAA existed for three years before merging with the National Basketball League to become the National Basketball Association.

Smith played in 48 games and averaged 1.5 points per game.

BAA career statistics

Regular season

Playoffs

References

External links
 

1920 births
2009 deaths
American men's basketball players
Basketball players from Idaho
Forwards (basketball)
People from Minidoka County, Idaho
Basketball players from Salt Lake City
St. Louis Bombers (NBA) players
Utah Utes men's basketball players